Japanese in Russia may refer to:
Japanese people in Russia, consisting mainly of Japanese expatriates and their descendants born in Russia
Japanese language education in Russia

See also
Japanese prisoners of war in the Soviet Union